Prince of Wales Drive (Ottawa Road #73) is a road serving Ottawa, Ontario, named after the eponymous road in Battersea, London, U.K. The northern section is a low-speed street running along the west bank of the Rideau River, while southern portions of the road were formerly Highway 16 (downgraded after the construction of Highway 416).

Prince of Wales Drive is the continuation of Queen Elizabeth Driveway beyond Preston Street. It runs around Dow's Lake and through the Central Experimental Farm before reaching a roundabout. There is a major intersection with Hunt Club Road, where several commuters from south Nepean use the bridge to cross the Rideau River.

Prince of Wales Drive follows the Rideau River past Barrhaven and Manotick. South of the intersection with Jockvale Road, the road diverts from the river and heads in a southwesterly direction toward North Gower, where it terminates at Fourth Line Road.

Prior to the construction of Highway 416, the stretch of Highway 16 that included Prince of Wales continued south to the Canada–US border into Saint Lawrence County, New York

In May 2007, the City approved the start of an environmental assessment study in regards of the future widening of the road from Fisher Avenue to Woodroffe Avenue from two to four lanes in accommodation to future expansion in Barrhaven, Manotick and Riverside South.

Major Intersections

  Preston Street
  Baseline Road &  Heron Road
  Meadowlands Drive & Hog's Back Road
  Hunt Club Road
  Fallowfield Road
  Merivale Road
  Strandherd Drive
  Longfields Drive
 Bankfield Road
  4th Line Road

External links

 City of Ottawa page on future widening of Prince of Wales Drive
 City Report Template on future widening project
 Battle to widen Prince of Wales heats up

Roads in Ottawa